Legislative elections were held in El Salvador on 12 March 1972. The result was a victory for the National Conciliation Party, which won 39 of the 52 seats. However, the election was marred by massive fraud and the Central Election Council disqualified the candidates of the opposition National Opposing Union (an alliance of the Christian Democratic Party, the National Revolutionary Movement and the Nationalist Democratic Union) in five out of fourteen constituencies. Voter turnout was 56.7%.

Results

References

Bibliography
Political Handbook of the world, 1972. New York, 1973. 
Caldera T., Hilda. 1983. Historia del Partido Demócrata Cristiano de El Salvador. Tegucigalpa: Instituto Centroamericano de Estudios Políticos.
El Salvador. Presidencia. Departamento de Relaciones Públicas. 1972. Elecciones del 72: 20 de febrero, 12 de marzo. San Salvador: Departamento de Relaciones Públicas, Casa Presidencial.
Montgomery, Tommie Sue. 1995. Revolution in El Salvador: from civil strife to civil peace. Boulder: Westview.
Webre, Stephen. 1979. José Napoleón Duarte and the Christian Democratic Party in Salvadoran Politics 1960-1972. Baton Rouge: Louisiana State University Press.
White, Alastair. 1973. El Salvador. New York: Praeger Publishers.
Williams, Philip J. and Knut Walter. 1997. Militarization and demilitarization in El Salvador's transition to democracy. Pittsburgh: University of Pittsburgh Press.

Legislative elections in El Salvador
1972 in El Salvador
1972 elections in Central America